Tenonitrozole is an antiprotozoal agent.

References

Antiprotozoal agents
Carboxamides
Nitrothiazoles
Thiophenes